Javier Bohuzlav Salazar Tejada (born 11 March 1982) is a Peruvian footballer who plays as a centre back. He currently plays for José Gálvez FBC.

Club career
Salazar started his senior career with Sport Boys in the 2002 Torneo Descentralizado. 

He then joined Deportivo Wanka the following season. There he scored his first goal in the Descentralizado in the 2-2 draw away to Coronel Bolognesi for Round 22 of the 2003 season.

Then in 2004 he joined Unión Huaral. He scored the winning goal in the 1-0 home win over his former club Sport Boys in Round 10 of the 2005 season.

Salazar played for Sporting Cristal in the 2006 Descentralizado season.

References

1982 births
Living people
Footballers from Lima
Peruvian footballers
Peruvian Primera División players
Sport Boys footballers
Club Deportivo Wanka footballers
Unión Huaral footballers
Sporting Cristal footballers
Cienciano footballers
José Gálvez FBC footballers
Club Deportivo Universidad César Vallejo footballers
Sport Huancayo footballers
Association football central defenders